CW 50 may refer to one of the following television stations:

Current 
 WDCW, Washington, D.C.
 WKBD-TV, Detroit, Michigan

Former 
 WPWR-TV, Chicago, Illinois (2016 to 2019)
 KLWB (TV), Lafayette, Louisiana (September 2006 to 2010)